Piotr Kuczera (born 25 February 1995) is a Polish judoka.

He is the 2016 European bronze medalist in the 90 kg division.

References

External links
 
 
 

1995 births
Polish male judoka
Living people
Place of birth missing (living people)
European Games competitors for Poland
Judoka at the 2019 European Games
Judoka at the 2020 Summer Olympics
Olympic judoka of Poland
20th-century Polish people
21st-century Polish people